Giannis Mousouris (born 28 January 1951) is a Greek former professional footballer who played as right back.

Club career
Born and raised in Piraeus, Mousouris started his career at the local club of Peramaikos. In 1970 he moved to Argonaftis Piraeus and with his appearances, he didn't take long to sign in one of the most famous clubs in the area, Ethnikos Piraeus, as he did in 1971. In the team's academies, he enacted with football on a systematic level and there he had the chance to work under two British coaches, Vic Buckingham and John Mortimore, who, although managers of the then men's team, worked twice a week with the infrastructure departments. Thus, from early on he learned to work hard in training and this helped to promote him to the first team in the summer of 1971. Competing as a striker, the young Mousouris found himself competing alongside players such as Michalis Kritikopoulos and Takis Chatziioannoglou for a position in the team's offensive line. At that time, the Thessalian BIOCARPET group of companies, which has taken over the wheel at AEL, since the beginning of the 70s, decided to strengthen the team's roster, in order to elevate the ckub and make them permanent in the first division. Among the transfer moves of the time, was the acquisition of Mousouris from Ethnikos in the summer of 1975.

Mousouris continued to be impressively productive in AEL's matches in the second division and aroused the interest of the then coach of AEK Athens, František Fadrhonc who arranged a friendly between AEL and AEK on 26 May 1977 exclusively to see Mousouris up close. The match took place in the evening as the floodlights at the Alcazar Stadium were inaugurated that day. Fadrhonc crystallised his positive opinion of Mousouris and as a result the player was transferred to AEK for 3 million drachmas in the summer of 1977, after a marathon race by the owner of the "yellow-blacks", Loukas Barlos with agents of AEL, who wanted Mousouris to move to PAOK.

The start of Mousouris in the "double-headed eagle" was indulgently impressive. In the first 6 matches, he scored 5 goals and everyone was talking about the club's new top scorer. Despite his impressive start, however, Zlatko Čajkovski, who had meanwhile replaced Fadrhonc in the technical leadership of the club, saw in Mousouris other gifts and virtues and he relocated him to the right side of the defensive line. Although Mousouris preferred playing in the offense, being completely happy with the conditions at AEK and realizing that with the return of the then injured Dušan Bajević and the duo he formed alongside Thomas Mavros in attack seemed unshakable, he accepted the change of his position without any complaints. Čik's choice was fully justified as Mousouris, possessing great speed and stride and having the attacking skills, developed into an irreplaceable modern right full-back, a pioneer for the era who, whenever was at the offense, he did not miss the opportunity to score. In his career at AEK he won 2 consecutive Championships and 1 Greek Cup including a domestic double in 1978. Leaving AEK in the summer of 1982, he played for three consecutive seasons in Veria, Rodos and Korinthos, until he retired in 1985.

After football
Although Mousouris obtained a coaching diploma, he never got involved in coaching, refusing to compromise with the bad practices of the field. Since 2002, he has been working professionally with the flower shop he owns in Perivolaki square in Nikaia.

Honours

AEK Athens
Alpha Ethniki: 1977–78, 1978–79 
Greek Cup: 1977–78

Individual
Beta Ethniki top scorer: 1976–77 (North Group)

References

1951 births
Living people
Greek footballers
Super League Greece players
Ethnikos Piraeus F.C. players
Athlitiki Enosi Larissa F.C. players
AEK Athens F.C. players
Veria F.C. players
Rodos F.C. players
Korinthos F.C. players
Association football defenders
Footballers from Piraeus